Škoda Elektra is trade name of line of trams made by Czech company Škoda Transportation of Pilsen (not to be confused with car manufacturer Škoda Auto of Mladá Boleslav). The designation applies to both unidirectional and bidirectional vehicles. The end parts of the vehicles (except 06T and 10T) were created by Porsche Design Group. The vehicles are built in the Škoda factory in Plzeň. 

Elektra trams were ordered by transport companies of Brno, Cagliari, Portland, Prague, Tacoma and Wrocław. As of April 2015, 176 units were ordered.

The line of Škoda Elektra trams includes:

Unidirectional

Bidirectional

Elektra